"Baby, What About You" is a song written by Josh Leo and Wendy Waldman, and recorded by American country music artist Crystal Gayle.  It was released in June 1983 as the third single from the album True Love.  The song was Gayle's twelfth number one on the country chart.  The single went to number one for one week and spent a total of twelve weeks on the country chart.

Charts

Weekly charts

Year-end charts

References

1983 songs
Crystal Gayle songs
1983 singles
Songs written by Josh Leo
Song recordings produced by Jimmy Bowen
Song recordings produced by Allen Reynolds
Elektra Records singles
Songs written by Wendy Waldman